USS Winjah (CVE-54) (originally AVG-54, later ACV-54), was a  of the United States Navy, leased to the Royal Navy during World War II.

Winjah was laid down on 5 June 1943 at Tacoma, Washington, by Seattle-Tacoma Shipbuilding. She was assigned to the United Kingdom under lend-lease on 23 June; she was redesignated CVE-54 on 15 July; launched on 22 November; and delivered to the British on 18 February 1944. From March to August 1945 she was part of the British Pacific Fleet attached to the 30th Aircraft Carrier Squadron.

Renamed HMS Reaper (D82), the carrier operated in the Royal Navy for the duration of World War II. After arriving at Norfolk, Virginia, on 13 May 1946, Reaper was decommissioned on 20 May and returned to the United States Government. Authorized for disposal on 14 June, Winjah was struck from the Navy Registry on 8 July and sold to the Waterman Steamship Company of Mobile, Alabama, on 12 February 1947 as South Africa Star. She was scrapped in Japan in May 1967.

Just after World War II, Reaper was responsible for bringing from Cherbourg Harbour many examples of former German Luftwaffe aircraft captured by the American military's Operation Lusty over to North America, such as the sole examples of the Arado Ar 234 jet reconnaissance bomber, and the Heinkel He 219 night fighter, that exist in American aviation museums in the 21st century. The aircraft arrived by air from Germany to Querqueville Airfield which is under a kilometer away from Cherbourg.

Design and description
These ships were larger and had a greater aircraft capacity than all the preceding American built escort carriers. They were also all laid down as escort carriers and not converted merchant ships.

Her armament comprised: two 4"/50, 5"/38 or 5"/51 Dual Purpose guns in single mounts, sixteen 40 mm Bofors anti-aircraft guns in twin mounts and twenty 20 mm Oerlikon anti-aircraft cannons in single mounts. The ship had a maximum aircraft capacity of twenty-four aircraft which could be a mixture of Grumman Martlets, Vought F4U Corsairs or Hawker Sea Hurricane fighter aircraft and Fairey Swordfish or Grumman Avenger anti-submarine torpedo bombers.

Notes

References

 

Ruler-class escort carriers
Ships built in Tacoma, Washington
World War II aircraft carriers of the United Kingdom
1943 ships